Theo-Alice Jeanne Carpenter (February 1, 1917 – January 5, 1994) was an American child actress of the silent era whose career in the entertainment industry spanned 74 years.

Biography
Born in Kansas City, Missouri, Carpenter started her film career at the age of three. Her film debut came in Daddy Long Legs. At age four, she traveled around the United States appearing in theaters on a promotional tour of her films.

Her fame grew in the early-1920s as she made a series of successful appearances in films such as, Helen's Babies with Baby Peggy, and The Sign of the Rose.

Maturity led to a change of roles for Carpenter. Becoming a young woman, she moved into character roles. She had occasional adult roles through 1940s, then she retired from film business.

Carpenter married Robert Grimes in 1949. She had four daughters and one son from two marriages. In 1964, she and all five children performed in the Plaza Players' production of Gypsy in Oxnard, California.

On January 5, 1994, Carpenter died of emphysema in Oxnard, California.

Filmography

References

External links

1917 births
1994 deaths
Actresses from Kansas City, Missouri
American film actresses
American silent film actresses
American child actresses
Deaths from emphysema
20th-century American actresses
Burials at Forest Lawn Memorial Park (Glendale)